Bloom's Arcade, now known as Blooms Apartments, is a Moderne-style shopping arcade built in 1930 in Tallulah, Louisiana, United States. It was listed on the National Register of Historic Places on January 19, 1989.

The arcade includes 12 interior shop bays marked by brick pilasters. The arcade space is capped by a continuous glass skylight. It has checkerboard terrazo floors and pressed metal paneled ceilings in many of the shops. It was designed by architect Noah Webster Overstreet of Jackson, Mississippi and was built by contractor Tom Wilmoth of Camden, Arkansas.

Its 1989 NRHP nomination stated "the arcade clearly retains its original character as a unique Louisiana example of what is essentially a European phenomenon."

In 2013 the structure was completely restored by Brownstone Group and is now housing an apartments complex.

See also
 National Register of Historic Places listings in Madison Parish, Louisiana

References

External links
 Blooms Apartments website

Commercial buildings on the National Register of Historic Places in Louisiana
Streamline Moderne architecture in the United States
Buildings and structures completed in 1930
Madison Parish, Louisiana